Eusebia Riquelme (born November 27, 1969) is a retired female track and field athlete from Cuba who competed in the sprint events during her career.

Career

She won the silver medal in the women's 4 x 100 metres relay at the 1991 Pan American Games, alongside teammates Liliana Allen, Julia Duporty and Idalmis Bonne.

Achievements

References

1969 births
Living people
Cuban female sprinters
Athletes (track and field) at the 1987 Pan American Games
Athletes (track and field) at the 1991 Pan American Games
Athletes (track and field) at the 1992 Summer Olympics
Olympic athletes of Cuba
Pan American Games silver medalists for Cuba
Pan American Games medalists in athletics (track and field)
Medalists at the 1987 Pan American Games
Medalists at the 1991 Pan American Games
Olympic female sprinters
20th-century Cuban women